Namibia national rugby team can refer to:
Namibia national rugby union team
Namibia national rugby sevens team